For Percy Heath is an album by bassist and composer William Parker's Little Huey Creative Music Orchestra, which was recorded in 2005 and released on the Canadian Victo label. The album is a suite of compositions inspired by and dedicated to bassist Percy Heath, who died in 2005.

Reception

AllMusic awarded the album 4½ stars stating "Sounding in part like Coltrane's Ascension or Cherry's Symphony for Improvisers, Parker's For Percy Heath is a four-part suite actuated by the Little Huey Creative Music Orchestra, here consisting of three trumpeters, three trombonists, three reed players, tuba, drums, and bass".

Track listing
All compositions by William Parker
 "For Percy Heath: Part One" - 10:34  
 "For Percy Heath: Part Two" - 9:49  
 "For Percy Heath: Part Three" - 10:15  
 "For Percy Heath: Part Four" - 17:40

Personnel
William Parker - bass
Roy Campbell Jr., Lewis Barnes, Matt Lavelle - trumpet 
Masahiko Kono, Alex Lodico, Steve Swell - trombone 
Dave Hofstra - tuba
Sabir Mateen - tenor saxophone
Rob Brown - alto saxophone
Charles Waters - alto saxophone, clarinet
Ori Kaplan - alto saxophone
Darryl Foster - tenor saxophone, soprano saxophone
Dave Sewelson - baritone saxophone
Andrew Barker - drums

References

2006 live albums
William Parker (musician) live albums